Aidia gardneri is a species of flowering plant in the family Rubiaceae. It is endemic to Sri Lanka.

Sources 

 http://www.theplantlist.org/tpl/record/kew-176308
 http://www.theplantlist.org/tpl/record/kew-5021
 https://www.gbif.org/species/120763617
 http://indiabiodiversity.org/species/show/265149

Endemic flora of Sri Lanka
Gardenieae